Dane Manning (born 15 April 1989) is a professional rugby league footballer who plays as a second-row forward for the Batley Bulldogs in the Betfred Championship.

He previously played for the Leeds Rhinos in the Super League, and Featherstone Rovers, Batley Bulldogs and Halifax in the Championship.

Career
Manning made one first team appearance for Leeds Rhinos in the 2009 Super League season, in a round 21 24–14 victory at home against Hull Kingston Rovers.

References

1989 births
Living people
Batley Bulldogs players
English rugby league players
Featherstone Rovers players
Halifax R.L.F.C. players
Leeds Rhinos players
Rugby league second-rows